Doug Church (born November 16, 1968, in Evanston, Illinois), is an American video game designer and producer. He attended MIT in the late 1980s, but left and went to work with Looking Glass Studios, when they were making primarily MS-DOS-based immersive sim games, including Ultima Underworld, Ultima Underworld II, System Shock and Thief. His colleague Warren Spector claims, in fact, that Church was the one who originally coined the term "immersive simulation".

Later, Church joined Eidos Interactive as technical director, lending programming and design expertise on a number of games from Ion Storm and Crystal Dynamics, including extensive design work on Tomb Raider: Legend. In 2005, he left Eidos to join Electronic Arts.

In 2003, Church was given the International Game Developers Association's Community Contribution award, in part for his work as co-chair of the IGDA's educational committee developing relationships between the game industry and academia.  He has also participated in many of the Indie Game Jams, including developing "Angry God Bowling," the prototypical game for the first IGJ.

From July 2005 to 2009, Church worked at Electronic Arts' Los Angeles office, as team leader on a project supervised by filmmaker Steven Spielberg.

On March 16, 2011, Valve announced that Church had been hired for an undisclosed position and project.

In August 2016, OtherSide Entertainment announced that Church had been hired as a creative consultant for the development of System Shock 3.

Games

References

External links
November 2004 Gamasutra interview with Church
"Formal Abstract Design Tools for Games" a notable early effort to develop a common language of game design methodology.

1968 births
American video game designers
Living people
Valve Corporation people